The Communauté de communes Avenir et développement du secteur des Trois Rivières is a former communauté de communes in the Seine-et-Marne département and in the Île-de-France région of France. It was established on 10 December 1993. It was merged into the new Communauté de communes du Pays de Coulommiers in January 2013.

Composition 
The Communauté de communes comprised the following communes:
Amillis
Beautheil
Chailly-en-Brie
Dagny
Marolles-en-Brie
Mauperthuis
Saints
Touquin

See also
Communes of the Seine-et-Marne department

References 

Seine-et-Marne
Former commune communities of Seine-et-Marne